Convoy QP 11 was an Arctic Convoy of World War II, made up of merchant ships returning from the Soviet Union to Britain after delivering their cargo to the Soviet Union. The convoy consisted of 13 merchant ships, escorted by 18 warships. The convoy was attacked by German destroyers and submarines, suffering the loss of one merchant ship as well as the light cruiser HMS Edinburgh. The German forces lost the destroyer Z7 Hermann Schoemann.

Ships 
QP 11 consisted of 13 merchant ships, mostly British or American, including five ships that had been a part of Convoy PQ 13. The convoy sailed from the Soviet port of Murmansk on 28 April 1942. The convoy was escorted by the light cruiser HMS Edinburgh, the destroyers HMS Amazon, Beagle, Beverley, Bulldog, Foresight and Forester, the corvettes Campanula, Oxlip, Saxifrage and Snowflake, with the armed trawler Lord Middleton. Edinburgh was not only serving as an escort, but was also carrying $20 million in gold, a payment from the Soviet Union to the United States.

Voyage
On 29 April, the convoy was spotted by a German Ju 88 reconnaissance plane as well as by German U-boats. Two days after leaving Murmansk, the convoy was attacked by several U-boats. On 30 May  and  both made unsuccessful attacks on the convoy. Later that day, however,  fired torpedoes at Edinburgh and scored two hits. One torpedo hit the cruiser's forward boiler room while the other hit the cruiser's stern, destroying its rudder and two of its four propellers. Edinburgh was badly damaged, but still afloat. Edinburgh left the convoy and headed back towards Murmansk, escorted by Foresight and Forester.

1 May
The German command sent the three destroyers of Zerstörergruppe "Arktis", Z7 Hermann Schoemann, Z24 and Z25 under the command of Kapitän zur See Alfred Schulze-Hinrichs, to attack QP 11 and then sink HMS Edinburgh. The German ships reached the convoy in the afternoon on 1 May. The weather was cold, and intermittent snow and rain limited visibility. Hermann Schoemann opened fire at 14:05. Amazon was hit twice and severely damaged. At 14:30 a German torpedo salvo hit and sunk the Soviet freighter Tsiolkovski. At 17:50 the German destroyers retired and turned to go after Edinburgh.

2 May
The cruiser was moving at only two knots. The Edinburgh was being escorted by Foresight, Forester, the four British minesweepers and Rubin (Gremyaschi and Sokrushitelny having returned to Murmansk due to a lack of fuel). The three German destroyers engaged the British ships. Due to the damage caused by U-456, Edinburgh was unable to maneuver and could only steam in circles. A snow shower separated Herman Schoemann from the other German destroyers, so it attacked the British ships alone. Edinburghs targeting systems had been destroyed by the torpedo explosions but its gunners managed to hit and cripple Hermann Schoemann. At 18:45, Z24 and Z25 arrived. Z25 hit and disabled Forester and then badly damaged Foresight. At 18:52 a salvo of torpedoes from one of the German destroyers missed Foresight and Forester. One of the torpedoes from this salvo kept going and struck Edinburgh in the middle of its left side, opposite the hole made by U-456s torpedo. Shortly thereafter the German ships withdrew, possibly because they overestimated the strength of the British minesweepers. At 08:15, Z24 rescued most of the crew of Hermann Schoemann who were still on the deck and then scuttled it. More survivors from Hermann Schoemann who were in life rafts were later rescued by U-88. The minesweepers Harrier and Gossamer took survivors off of Edinburgh, which was later sunk by a torpedo from Foresight.

Aftermath
The twelve remaining merchant ships of the convoy arrived in Iceland on 7 May.

Ship List

References 

QP 11
Naval battles of World War II involving Germany
Naval battles of World War II involving the United Kingdom
Naval battles of World War II involving the Soviet Union